Les Hay Babies is an indie folk trio from New Brunswick, Canada.  Its members—Julie Aubé (banjo), Katrine Noël (ukulele) and Vivianne Roy (guitar)—each grew up in a small Acadian village.

Background
The members first met while performing as solo artists at "Accros de la chanson", a music competition sponsored by the province of New Brunswick.  In 2009 and 2010, each member was a prize winner.

The trio met again at another music contest, "le Gala de la chanson de Caraquet", and in November 2011, Les Hay Babies formed.

At the East Coast Music Awards in Moncton in 2012, Les Hay Babies surprised guests by performing in elevators.

Les Hay Babies began performing in The Maritimes and Québec.  After performing at the Festival Interceltique de Lorient in France, they were described as "an instant hit in Europe", which led to three continental tours where they performed in Switzerland, Germany, France and Belgium.

In May 2013, Les Hay Babies won the Francouvertes. In 2014 they performed in the Francophone Festival at Harbourfront in Toronto.

Discography

Extended play
 Folio (July 2012) - a bilingual disc featuring six group originals.

Albums
 Mon Homesick Heart (April 2014).
 La 4ième dimension (version longue) (October 2016).
 Boite aux Lettres (February 2020).

References

External links 

Musical groups established in 2011
Musical groups from Moncton
Canadian folk rock groups
2011 establishments in New Brunswick
Canadian indie folk groups
Canadian Folk Music Award winners